is a Japanese voice actress and basketball player associated with 81 Produce.
She is best known for voicing Linze Silhoueska in In Another World with My Smartphone and Yui Akitsuki in Minami Kamakura High School Girls Cycling Club and has won two Seiyu Awards.

Biography
Yui Fukuo was born on 25 April 1994 in Hyōgo Prefecture. She was a member of AŌP when they won the Special Award at the 10th Seiyu Awards in 2016. On 28 February 2018, it was announced that she would graduate from the group due to her devotion to the voice acting industry.

In 2013, she received the Studio Deen Award at the 7th 81 Audition. She won her second Seiyu Award in 2018 when she was awarded the Best Rookie Actress award alongside Ayaka Nanase.

On 29 August 2018, she was announced as a member of the Seiyu Jr Basuke 3x3 SJ3.LEAGUE, described as the "first basketball league for voice actors", and played for the Cherubiacchi team.

In 2017, she voiced Linze Silhoueska in In Another World with My Smartphone and Yui Akitsuki in Minami Kamakura High School Girls Cycling Club.

Filmography

Anime
2016
 ReLIFE, volleyball club kōhai
 Seisen Cerberus: Ryūkoku no Fatalite, Yupide
 Time Travel Girl, Rika Hayase
2017
 In Another World with My Smartphone, Linze Silhoueska
 Minami Kamakura High School Girls Cycling Club, Yui Akitsuki
2018
 Kiratto Pri Chan, Hokuto Imozaki
2019
 If It's for My Daughter, I'd Even Defeat a Demon Lord, Maya
 King of Prism: Shiny Seven Stars, audience
2020
 By the Grace of the Gods, Cilia
2023
 In Another World with My Smartphone 2nd Season, Linze Silhoueska

Film
2016
 Pop in Q, Nyaos

Video games
2019
Hachigatsu no Cinderella Nine, Rin Reifa
2020
Magia Record, Mouka Megumi

Radio 
2018
 Yappari S ga Suki: Say You! Love Me!

References

External links
 Official profile (Japanese)
 

Japanese voice actresses
Japanese women's basketball players
81 Produce voice actors
Voice actresses from Hyōgo Prefecture
Sportspeople from Hyōgo Prefecture
1994 births
Living people